"Reasons to Be Cheerful, Part 3" is a song and single by Ian Dury and the Blockheads, initially released as the single "Reasons to be Cheerful, Part 3 / Common as Muck" issued on 20 July 1979 and reached number 3 in the UK Singles Chart the following month. It is the last single to be released by the band in their original line-up.

Recording
"Reasons to be Cheerful" was not recorded at The Workhouse, Old Kent Road with the material that made up the Do it Yourself album, but in Eretcia Studios (owned by RCA) in Rome during a break in a long European tour. According to its writer, Ian Dury, the song was inspired by a near-fatal accident involving a lighting roadie. Roadie Charley almost got electrocuted in Italy by a microphone stand while leaning over a mixing desk. Another roadie saved his life, hence 'no electric shocks' is included in the song's lyrics. The song was written in the band's hotel during the aftermath of this, and a fight at the venue was only narrowly averted when the band were forced to cancel the show because of the safety issues. Both it and the B-side "Common As Muck" were recorded in the break in the tour caused by the cancellation of the Italian shows.

Dury said, "there were two songs that we didn't put on Do it Yourself that were even more miserable than the ones that we did put on it. So, it seemed sensible to cheer up a bit. In a way, it was inspired by the Sergeant Peppers sleeve... just a load of nice people. I write quite a lot of songs that are just lists."

Saxophonist Davey Payne was upset about the financial disparities within Dury's band, so in order to placate him, Dury told co-writer Chaz Jankel to incorporate a sax solo part in the middle, which Payne could improvise and thus earn a share in the song.

Composition

The song has been described as a 'shopping-list song'. It is a simple list of a number of reasons to be cheerful. In that respect it is almost identical to an older Ian Dury track, "England's Glory", a song that he had refused to revive when asked the previous year. The list of reasons to be cheerful includes:

 Rock 'n' Roll singer Buddy Holly
 Little Richard's 1956 hit "Good Golly Miss Molly"
 Hammersmith Palais, London
 The Bolshoi Ballet of Moscow, Russia
 British automobile company Scammell Lorries (specifically their 18-wheeler truck)
 Equal voting rights
 Piccadilly Circus, London
 Genitalia ('Fanny Smith and Willy')
 Oatmeal breakfast cereal ('porridge oats')
 Generosity and politeness
 Yellow socks
 Carrot juice
 Wine (specifically claret)
 Elvis (Presley) and Scotty (Moore), his guitarist
 Going to the toilet ('sitting on the potty')
 A cure for smallpox
 The National Health Service's free prescription glasses 
 Male and female prostitutes ('Gigolos and Brasses')
 Smoking a bong ('lighting up the chalice')
 Skiffle singer Wee Willie Harris
 Stephen Biko 
 Jamaican trombonist Rico Rodriguez, who would go on to play with Coventry band The Specials the same year as "Reasons to be Cheerful"'s release
 The Marx Brothers ('Harpo, Groucho, Chico')
 Popular British sandwich ('Cheddar cheese and pickle')
 British motorcycle manufacturer Vincent Motorcycles (pronounced in the song as  'motorsickle' to rhyme with pickle and tickle)
 Sex ('slap and tickle')
 American comedian Woody Allen
 Spanish painter Salvador Dalí
 Russian composer Dmitri Shostakovich
 The opera Don Pasquale by Gaetano Donizetti
 The popular song Volare
 Soul singer Smokey Robinson
 Being released from prison ('Coming out of chokey')
 Saying 'okey-dokey'
 Being naked ('Being in my nuddy')
 Jazz saxophonist John Coltrane, specifically his soprano saxophone playing.
 Italian singer-songwriter Adriano Celentano
 1940s and 1950s film actor Bonar Colleano
 Self-education ("something nice to study")

The single's B-side, "Common as Muck", is a celebration of being 'common' (working class). Like its A-side, it is filled with name checks of disparate celebrities, including Lionel Blair, Evonne Goolagong, Patience Strong, Jack Palance, Sydney Tafler, Fred Astaire, Shirley Abicair, Victor Hugo, Dirk Bogarde and Nellie Melba. Nellie Dean refers to the well-known music hall song of that name, while Rodney Reigate is a purely fictitious character.

Re-releases and versions
As with "Hit Me with Your Rhythm Stick" before it, "Reasons to be Cheerful" can now be found easily on every Ian Dury compilation to date. Like all of Ian Dury's singles, this was not originally the case because, in keeping with Ian Dury's singles policy at the time, the song was omitted from the next album (Laughter) and was not made available again. It first re-appeared on the compilation album Jukebox Dury two years later in 1981.

Demon Records chose, bizarrely, to add "Reasons to Be Cheerful" as the sole bonus track to its CD re-issue of Laughter. This was an unusual choice considering it has no relation to that album, which was recorded by another line-up of the band including former Dr. Feelgood guitarist Wilko Johnson, and that the song had already been included as a bonus track on their re-issue of Do It Yourself.

Edsel Records included "Reasons to be Cheerful" and also the extended mix of the song on its 2-Disc edition of Do It Yourself.

Versions
For the 12" version of the single, a longer remixed version of the track was released, this was later included as a bonus track for both Demon and Edsel Records CD re-issues of the Do it Yourself  album

A live version of "Reasons to Cheerful" omitted from the original record, was added as a bonus track to the CD re-issue of Ian Dury and The Blockhead's Live Album Warts 'n' Audience it closes the band's set and features Ian Dury promising to make an album in the near future.

As the finale to Charlie Brooker's 2014 Wipe, The Blockheads played an adaptation called "Reasons to be Fearful '14", with Brooker providing alternative lyrics relating to the events of 2014.

The song provides the title for the 2010 musical Reasons to be Cheerful by the Graeae Theatre Company.

Title 
Similar to "Sex and Drugs and Rock and Roll", "Reasons to be Cheerful" can be found spelt various ways, including on some official Ian Dury records. Variations included "Reasons to be Cheerful Part 3", with no comma, "Reasons to be Cheerful (Part 3)", "Reasons to be Cheerful pt. 3", "Reasons to be Cheerful (Pt. 3)", and simply "Reasons to be Cheerful". The original single spells it "Reasons to be Cheerful, Part 3" on the label of the 7" pressing, "Reasons to be Cheerful, Pt. 3" on the label of the 12" but "Reasons to be Cheerful (Part Three)" on the cover of both pressings.

References

Bibliography

External links
 Reasons to Be Cheerful, Part 3 – lyrics at iandury.com

1979 singles
List songs
Road crew
Songs written by Chaz Jankel
Songs written by Ian Dury
Ian Dury songs
Stiff Records singles
1979 songs